Mentiqa covers a concept of views on and experiences with education of highly gifted pupils in Denmark. It was founded by Pernille Buch-Rømer in the belief that schooling with like-minded children makes it possible for the highly gifted pupil to develop adequate social skills. Thus the main point of Mentiqa is to care for the well-being of its pupils, which is made possible through the acceptance of the highly gifted pupil's special behaviour and way of thinking. This means that concepts such as inclusiveness and differentiated teaching are defined through a fundamental idea that treating children equally is treating them differently.

Mentiqa schools 
In Denmark, congregated schools for highly gifted pupils occur only as private initiatives. Therefore, Mentiqa schools are private schools established and run by parents of highly gifted pupils.

The first Mentiqa-school was established in Søborg, a suburb of Copenhagen, in 2004.

Mentiqa-Odense was established on Fyn in 2006, shortly before the first Mentiqa-school changed its name to Atheneskolen (the Athena School).

Mentiqa-Nordjylland (Northern Jutland) was established in Ålborg in 2008, but no Mentiqa-school has been established since.

References

External links
Pernille Buch-Rømer - Official page 
Mentiqa-Odense - Official page 
Mentiqa-Nordjylland - Official page 
Atheneskolen - Official page 

Education in Denmark
Gifted education